New York City Interborough Railway was a streetcar transit system chartered in 1902 to construct feeder lines to serve Interborough Rapid Transit's subway and elevated stations in The Bronx. The streetcar lines were given permission to cross the Harlem River bridges to gain access to the Manhattan lines. The railway opened for business in 1906, and came under direct control of Interborough Rapid Transit in 1910. An agreement was reached with Third Avenue Railway to purchase the franchises and continue operating streetcar service in 1911.

See also
Third Avenue Railway
Interborough Rapid Transit
Long Island Consolidated Electrical Companies

References

Report of the Public Service Commission of the First District of the State of New York, For the year ending December 31, 1908 (Page 663)

Streetcar lines in Manhattan
Streetcar lines in the Bronx
Streetcars in New York (state)
Predecessors and affiliates of the Interborough Rapid Transit Company
Third Avenue Railway
Defunct public transport operators in the United States
Defunct New York (state) railroads
Railway companies established in 1902
1902 establishments in New York City